Cala (or CALA) may refer to:

Geography
 Cala, Eastern Cape, a town in South Africa
 Cala, Huelva, a town and municipality in Huelva province, Spain
 Cala Gonone, a civil parish of Dorgali municipality, Sardinia, Italy

Acronym
 Club Atlético Los Andes, an alternative name for Argentinean sports club Los Andes de Lomas de Zamora
 A business acronym for the Caribbean and Latin America or Central America and Latin America; see List of country groupings
 Chinese American Librarians Association
 Railroad reporting mark for the Carolina Southern Railroad

People 
 Cala (footballer, born 1989), Spanish football defender
 Cala (footballer, born 1990), Spanish football midfielder
 Aristóbulo Cala (born 1990), Colombian cyclist
 Ugo Calà (1904–1983), Italian chess player

Other uses
 Cala Foods, a supermarket chain predominantly located in San Francisco
 CALA Homes, a British housebuilding company 
 Lamborghini Calà, a concept car
 Cañón 155 mm. L 45 CALA 30, an Argentinean long range gun
 Cala Records, a record label founded by Australian conductor Geoffrey Simon

See also
 Calah, Biblical name of the city of Nimdrud
 Calla (disambiguation)
 Kala (disambiguation)
 Calas (disambiguation)